Cameron Peter Daddo (born 7 March 1965) is an Australian actor, musician and presenter. From 1987 to 1988, he hosted dating game show Perfect Match Australia. He won two Logie Awards for his performances in Golden Fiddles and Tracks of Glory. After moving to Los Angeles, Daddo played Brian Peterson in soap opera Models Inc.. He also starred in F/X: The Series, Hope Island and She Spies. He hosted the 2007 reality show Pirate Master on CBS. In 2020, Daddo joined the cast of Home and Away as Evan Slater. In addition to his acting career, Daddo is also a musician and radio host. He joined smoothfm in 2012 as the host of Sunday mornings, before moving on to host Mellow Music in the evenings.

Early life
Daddo was born in Melbourne, Victoria, on 7 March 1965, the eldest son of Peter and Bronwen Daddo. His father was a jewellery designer.

Career

Acting career
Daddo's first television role was host of a children's show called Off the Dish, which soon led to him hosting The Cameron Daddo Cartoon Show. Daddo replaced Greg Evans as the host of dating game show Perfect Match Australia from 1987 to 1988. He was 21 years old, which made him the youngest host of an Australian game show. Daddo then appeared in the telemovie Bony based on the books by Arthur Upfield (1990). He won the Logie Award for Most Popular Actor in a Telemovie or Miniseries in 1992 for his appearance in miniseries Golden Fiddles and again in 1993 for Tracks of Glory. He also appeared in the SBS documentary Filthy Rich and Homeless.

Daddo moved to Los Angeles in 1992 to pursue his acting career in Hollywood. He was cast in a role as a photographer in the Melrose Place spin-off Models Inc.. He also made a one-off appearance in a 1993 episode of The Young Indiana Jones Chronicles.

In 1996, he appeared as Rollie Tyler in F/X: The Series. He appeared in the PAX TV network's Hope Island from 1999 to 2000. In 2000, he appeared in Anne of Green Gables: The Continuing Story as Jack Garrison, an American writer who had an important role during World War I. Daddo appeared as Samuel Clemens in the 2003 television pilot Riverworld based on the popular novels. He had a role as Quentin Cross in the second season (2003–2004) of She Spies.

Daddo had a role in David Lynch's 2006 film Inland Empire, and also in Big Momma's House 2. In 2007, Daddo hosted the Mark Burnett reality show Pirate Master on CBS, and appeared in the movie Drifter. In 2009, he played the role of Vice President Mitchell Hayworth on 24. Daddo also appears in episodes of The Mentalist and Leverage.

Daddo starred as the interviewer in an Australian Adult Romance feature film SIX LOVERS, which finished production in 2010 and was released in 2012. In 2014, he appeared in the Australian Theatre Company's Los Angeles production of Holding the Man opposite Nate Jones, Roxane Wilson and Adam J. Yeend.

In 2012, Daddo returned to the Australian stage for the first time in 20 years as Professor Callahan in the Australian production of Legally Blonde. Daddo was cast in the role of Captain Georg Von Trapp in the 2016 Australian Tour of the London Palladium production of The Sound of Music opposite Amy Lehpamer in the role of Maria.

From May to June 2020, Daddo appeared in Home and Away as Evan Slater, the estranged father of Ryder Jackson (Lukas Radovich).

In 2022, Daddo co-hosted the fifth season of travel series Luxury Escapes with Sophie Falkiner.

Radio career
In October 2012, Daddo joined smoothfm as Sunday Mornings host (8am - 10am).

In March 2013, Daddo became the host of Mellow Music which airs nightly (8pm - midnight) on smoothfm.

Personal life
Daddo is the eldest of five siblings. His brothers Andrew Daddo and Lochie Daddo are also actors. Daddo met model Alison Brahe in 1991 and they married the following year. They have three children.

Discography

Albums

Singles

Awards

Mo Awards
The Australian Entertainment Mo Awards (commonly known informally as the Mo Awards), were annual Australian entertainment industry awards. They recognise achievements in live entertainment in Australia from 1975 to 2016.
 (wins only)
|-
| 1989
| Cameron Daddo
| Musical Theatre Performer of the Year (Male) 
| 
|-

References

External links

Official website

1965 births
20th-century Australian male actors
21st-century Australian male actors
Australian male film actors
Australian game show hosts
Australian male television actors
Australian male voice actors
Australian expatriate male actors in the United States
Australian people of Cornish descent
Australian people of Italian descent
Living people
Logie Award winners
Male actors from Melbourne